James Duncan McAlister (born 2 November 1985 in Rothesay) is a retired Scottish footballer, who is most known for being club captain for Greenock Morton, making 361 appearances for the club. 

Although predominantly right-footed, McAlister played on the left side of midfield in an eight-year first spell at Morton and was transformed into a right wing-back while at Hamilton Academical. At Dundee, he established himself as a central midfielder. After a three-year spell in English football with Blackpool, McAlister returned to Morton in 2018 and retired midway through the 2020–21 season.

Playing career

Greenock Morton
McAlister was raised on the Isle of Bute and attended Rothesay Primary School and Rothesay Academy. He made his Greenock Morton debut as a substitute against Peterhead at Cappielow Park on 28 December 2002 at 17 years old. His first start was made a few months later on 15 February 2003 away at Elgin City as an attacker.

Over the next couple of seasons, McAlister flirted with Morton's first team while playing regularly for the reserve side. The manager John McCormack introduced McAlister to the first team as a result of his performances in the reserves. By season 2004–05 McAlister had forced his way into Morton's first team, and such were his performances that he went on to start in every league match that season, barring one in which he appeared as a substitute. As a result, he was offered a new three-year contract which he signed in July 2005.

Some of his performances led to comparisons with Barcelona player Ronaldinho and resulted in a number of fans giving him the tongue-in-cheek nickname 'Jimaldinho'.

McAlister started 107 consecutive league matches for Morton (including the two playoff games against Peterhead in 2006), with the last game he missed being a meaningless game against Forfar Athletic at the end of the 2005–2006 season. However, this run came to an end as he missed a game on 2 May 2009 due to suspension for accumulating five yellow cards.

On 21 July 2009, after a friendly loss to Romania's champions Unirea Urziceni, McAlister was approached by head coach Dan Petrescu to join Unirea, also offering him the chance to play in the UEFA Champions League. McAlister went on trial to Football League Championship side Watford in August 2009. Watford manager Malky Mackay told the club that they intended to keep an eye on McAlister over the weeks following the trial. He also attracted interest from Morton's rivals St Mirren, as claimed by the Greenock Telegraph towards the end of the January 2010 transfer window.

In April 2010, McAlister broke his foot in a 3–3 draw with Queen of the South.

Hamilton Academical
He was released by Morton at the end of the 2009–10 season, and joined Hamilton Academical. He played in the club's defeat in the 2012 Scottish Challenge Cup Final, and scored his first and only goal for the Accies in a 5–1 loss at Ross County on 28 April 2012.

Dundee
After his release by Hamilton, McAlister went on trial at English side Carlisle United after being recommended by former boss at Morton, Davie Irons and then trained at his previous club Greenock Morton. In August 2012, he signed for Scottish Premier League side Dundee. He  went on to be an almost ever-present in the Dundee midfield, playing 125 times, scoring 12 times.

Blackpool
McAlister signed with Blackpool on 29 July 2015 after playing three pre-season friendlies for them. He joined on a free transfer in a two-year deal with an option for a third year. He scored his first goal for Blackpool in a 4-2 EFL Cup win against Bolton Wanderers on 9 August 2016.
It was confirmed that McAllister broke his leg in a 1–1 draw against Colchester United on 4 February 2017, ruling him out for the remainder of the season. He was released by Blackpool at the end of the 2017–18 season.

Greenock Morton
McAlister signed a one-year contract with Morton in June 2018. On 16 July, he was announced as club captain.

On 3 June 2019, McAlister signed a one-year extension, committing himself to the club until 10 June 2020.

McAlister retired from playing football in January 2021.

Post playing career
He joined Rangers in 2021 as a Kitman. He was promoted to chief Kitman following the sudden death of Jimmy Bell in May 2022.

Career statistics

Club

Honours
Greenock Morton
Scottish Third Division: 2002–03
Scottish Second Division: 2006–07

Hamilton Academical
Scottish Challenge Cup Runner-Up: 2012

Dundee
 Scottish Championship: 2013–14

Blackpool
League Two Promotion: 2016–17

See also
 2008–09 Greenock Morton F.C. season
 2009–10 Greenock Morton F.C. season

References

External links

 (incorrect for Morton)

1985 births
Association football midfielders
Blackpool F.C. players
Dundee F.C. players
English Football League players
Greenock Morton F.C. players
Hamilton Academical F.C. players
Living people
Livingston F.C. players
People from Rothesay, Bute
Scottish Football League players
Scottish footballers
Scottish Premier League players
Scottish Professional Football League players
Sportspeople from Scottish islands
People educated at Rothesay Academy
Sportspeople from Argyll and Bute
Rangers F.C. non-playing staff